Manrape is a 1975 novel by Märta Tikkanen. The book launched Tikkanen's career and placed her in the centre of an ongoing debate about gender roles in the Nordic countries.

The book was made into the 1978 film Men Can't Be Raped, directed by Jörn Donner.

1975 Swedish novels
Swedish-language novels
20th-century Finnish novels